The 1977 Finnish motorcycle Grand Prix was the eleventh round of the 1977 Grand Prix motorcycle racing season. It took place on 31 July 1977 at the Imatra circuit.

500cc classification

350 cc classification

250 cc classification

125 cc classification

References

Finnish motorcycle Grand Prix
Finnish
Motorcycle Grand Prix